Raphides (singular raphide   or raphis) are needle-shaped crystals of calcium oxalate monohydrate (prismatic monoclinic crystals) or calcium carbonate as aragonite (dipyramidal orthorhombic crystals), found in more than 200 families of plants.
Both ends are needle-like, but raphides tend to be blunt at one end and sharp at the other.

Calcium oxalate in plants 

Many plants accumulate calcium oxalate crystals in response to surplus calcium, which is found throughout the natural environment. The crystals are produced in a variety of shapes. The crystal morphology depends on the taxonomic group of the plant. In one study of over 100 species, it was found that calcium oxalate accounted for 6.3% of plant dry weight. Crystal morphology and the distribution of raphides (in roots or leaves or tubers etc.) is similar in some taxa but different in others leaving possible opportunities for plant key characteristics and systematic identification; mucilage in raphide containing cells makes light microscopy difficult, though. Little is known about the mechanisms of sequestration or indeed the reason for accumulation of raphides but it is most likely as a defense mechanism against herbivory. It has also been suggested that in some cases raphides may help form plant skeletal structure. Raphides typically occur in parenchyma cells in aerial organs especially the leaves, and are generally confined to the mesophyll. As the leaf area increases, so does the number of raphides, the process starting in even young leaves. The first indications that the cell will contain crystals is shown when the cells enlarge with a larger nucleus.

Raphides are found in specialized plant cells or crystal chambers called idioblasts. Electron micrographs have shown that raphide needle crystals are normally four sided or H-shaped (with a groove down both sides) or with a hexagonal cross section and some are barbed. Wattendorf (1976) suggested that all circular sectioned raphides, as visible in a light microscope, are probably hexagonal in cross section The hexagonal crystals reported by Wattendorf in Agave americana were apparently calcium oxalate.

Microscopy using polarized light shows bright opalescence with raphides.

Plants like Tradescantia pallida also accumulate calcium oxalate crystals in response to heavy metals stress.

Harmful effects 
Raphides can produce severe toxic reactions by facilitating the passage of toxin through the herbivore's skin when the tissue containing the raphides also contains toxins. The lethal dose to mice is around 15 mg/kg. Raphides seem to be a defense mechanism against plant predators, as they are likely to tear and harm the soft tissues of the throat or esophagus of a plant predator chewing on the plant's leaves. The venomous process is in two stages: mechanical pricking and injection of harmful protease. Typically ingestion of plants containing raphides, like those common in certain houseplants, can cause immediate numbing followed shortly by painful edema, vesicle formation and dysphagia accompanied by painful stinging and burning to the mouth and throat with symptoms occurring for up to two weeks. Airway assessment and management are of the highest priority, as are extensive irrigation and analgesics in eye exposure.

Raphides cannot normally be destroyed by boiling; that requires an acidic environment or chemical solvents like ether.  Plants containing large amounts of raphides are generally acrid and unpalatable.  However, it is not always possible to detect the presence of raphides through taste alone.  In some tubers such as Indian turnip which contain large quantities of raphides, the roots are not unpalatable when cooked because the raphides are bound within a matrix of starch which prevents the tongue from sensing their presence.  Some other plants store raphides in mucilaginous environments and also do not taste acrid.

Plants containing raphides 

Common names vary. The following list is incomplete. Raphides are found in many species in the families Araceae and Commelinaceae, but are also found in a few species in a number of other families.

Actinidiaceae:
 Actinidia (Kiwifruit)

Amaranthaceae:
 Beta (Beets, Swiss Chard)
 Spinacia (Spinach)

Araceae:
 Alocasia  (Baibing in NE India)
 Arisaema  (Cobra Lily)
 Arum (Cuckoopint)
 Caladium  (Angel wings)
 Colocasia (Taro, Cocoyam, Eddoe)
 Dieffenbachia (Dumb Cane)
 Epipremnum (Devil's Ivy, Pothos)
 Monstera  (Swiss Cheese Plant)
 Philodendron (Elephant Ears)
 Spathiphyllum (Peace Lily)
 Zantedeschia (Calla Lily)

Araliaceae:
 Brassaia  (Umbrella Tree)

Arecaceae:
 Caryota   (Fishtail Palm)
 Ptychosperma
 Arenga
 Hyophorbe verschaffeltii (Spindle palm)

Asparagaceae:
 Agave (Agave)
 Chlorophytum orchidastrum (Green Orange)
Bromeliaceae:
 Ananas comosus (Pineapple)

Commelinaceae:
 Commelina (Dayflower)
 Tradescantia (Wandering Jew)
 Triceratella

Onagraceae:
 Fuchsia (Fuchsia)

Polygonaceae:
 Rheum rhabarbarum (Rhubarb)

Rubiaceae:
 Hillia

Vitaceae:
 Parthenocissus quinquefolia (Virginia creeper)

See also 
 Calcium oxalate
 Druse
 Plant defense against herbivory

References 

Plant physiology
Oxalate minerals
Organic minerals
Plant toxins